The 46th Regiment Illinois Volunteer Infantry was an infantry regiment that served in the Union Army during the American Civil War.

Service
The 46th  Illinois Infantry was organized at Camp Butler, Illinois and mustered into Federal service on December 28, 1861.

The regiment was mustered out on January 20, 1866.

Total strength and casualties
The regiment suffered 7 officers and 74 enlisted men who were killed in action or mortally wounded and 1 officer and 253 enlisted men who died of disease, for a total of 335 fatalities.

Commanders
Colonel John A. Davis - died of wounds on October 10, 1862
 Lieutenant Colonel John J. Jones
Colonel Benjamin Dornblaser - mustered out with the regiment.

See also
List of Illinois Civil War Units
Illinois in the American Civil War

References

External links
The Civil War Archive

Further reading

Units and formations of the Union Army from Illinois
1861 establishments in Illinois
Military units and formations established in 1861
Military units and formations disestablished in 1866
1866 disestablishments in Illinois